Racism in Lithuania appears mainly in the form of negative attitudes and actions towards people who are not considered ethnically Lithuanian, especially if the foreigner is of different race. According to the data provided by the Centre for Ethnic Studies, Roma people, Chechens, refugees and Muslims are regarded with disfavour most of all in Lithuania. Anti-Polish sentiments are also very strong in Lithuania. However, recent research showed that Lithuanians themselves claim to be tolerant. The problem of racism is still not widely admitted, although the Government itself has put some effort to reduce xenophobia in Lithuania. Since the mid-2000s the Law on Equal Opportunities forbids any direct or indirect discrimination on the basis of racial or ethnic origin, gender, religion, nationality or belonging to any other group.

Lithuania is a member of the following international instruments aimed to combat racism: Additional Protocol to the Convention on Cybercrime (since 2007), Framework Convention for the Protection of National Minorities (since 2000) and Convention on the Elimination of All Forms of Racial Discrimination (since 1998; individual complaints against Lithuania aren't allowed).

The approximate number of xenophobic acts is not known in Lithuania, but the level of racism varies depending on the region. According to the journalist I. Larionovaitė, Klaipėda should be considered the most racist town in Lithuania, since it is the only city which is not a signatory of a program for refugees, accepted by the Government.

There was one incident where an individual was hurt because of his ethnic background. In 2007 a refugee from Somalia Gulaid Abdiaziz Salah legally living in Klaipeda was beaten after he had spoken up about the racism in Lithuania to the media.

See also
 Lithuanization
 Racism in Europe

References

External links
CERD concluding observations on Lithuania
Report of the UN Special Rapporteur on Contemporary forms of racism, racial discrimination, xenophobia and related intolerance on his visit to Lithuania, 2008
European Commission against Racism and Intolerance — reports on Lithuania
 ENAR reports on Lithuania: 2005, 2006, 2007, 2008, 2009/10, 2010/11, 2011/12, 2012/13, 2013/14

 
Lithuania